Fabian Koch (born 24 June 1989) is an Austrian professional footballer who plays as a right-back for Tiroler Liga club FC Natters.

On 9 May 2018 he played as Sturm Graz best Red Bull Salzburg in extra time to win the 2017/18 Austrian Cup.

Honours
Sturm Graz
Austrian Cup: 2017–18

References

1989 births
Living people
Association football defenders
Austrian footballers
Austrian Football Bundesliga players
2. Liga (Austria) players
FC Wacker Innsbruck (2002) players
FK Austria Wien players
SK Sturm Graz players
WSG Tirol players
People from Innsbruck-Land District
Footballers from Tyrol (state)